Freeskates consist of two separate metal or wooden plates with two wheels attached. People call it freeskating, freeline skating, or drift skating.

History
They were developed in 2003 in San Francisco by Ryan Farrelly. Farrelly founded a company called Freeline that has since gone out of business. Freeskating is practiced around the world. In 2015, former members of the original brand (Freeline) came together to create JMKRIDE. Based in San Diego, California JMKRIDE aimed to revive the sport they loved so much. The sport was rebranded to be called "freeskating" to reach worldwide riders.

Gallery

References

External links 
 History of Freeskating
 Learn to Freeskate
 twenty4action
 Freeline Skate demo
 How To Freeline Skate, on YouTube
 This is Freeskating - All Styles

Roller skating
Aggressive skating
Roller skating equipment
Skateboarding equipment